David Henshaw may refer to:

 David Henshaw (American politician) (1791–1852), United States Secretary of the Navy
 David Henshaw (Australian politician) (1931–2008), member of the Victorian Legislative Council
 David Henshaw (cartoonist) (1939–2014), New Zealand cartoonist
 David Henshaw (administrator), chief executive of Liverpool City Council